This is a list of notable people from Maharashtra, India

Art
 Mangesh Tendulkar
 Pramod Kamble
 S. D. Phadnis

Actors

Ajinkya Dev
Amol Palekar
Ankush Chaudhari
Ashok Saraf
Atul Kulkarni
Bharat Jadhav
Chandrakant Mandare
Dada Kondke
Dilip Prabhavalkar
Kashinath Ghanekar
Kuldeep Pawar
Laxmikant Berde
Mahesh Kothare
Makarand Anaspure
Makarand Deshpande
Master Vinaayak
Milind Gunaji
Milind Soman
Mohan Gokhale
Nana Patekar
Nilu Phule
Nishikant Kamat
Prabhakar Panshikar
Prashant Damle
Riteish Vilasrao Deshmukh
Sharad Talwalkar
Sachin Khedekar
Sachin Pilgaonkar
Sadashiv Amrapurkar
Sandeep Kulkarni
Sanjay Narvekar
Sayaji Shinde
Shahu Modak
Shivaji Satham
Shreyas Talpade
Siddharth Jadhav
Sudhir Joshi
Subodh Bhave
Vikram Gokhale

Actresses

Alka Kubal
Aditi Govitrikar
Ashwini Bhave
Bhavana
Durga Khote
 Genelia Deshmukh
Isha Koppikar
Jayshree Gadkar
Lalita Pawar
Leela Chitnis
Kavita Lad
Kimi Katkar
Madhuri Dixit
Mamta Kulkarni
Meena Kumari
Mugdha Godse
Namrata Shirodkar
Nishigandha Wad
Nivedita Joshi
Nutan
Padmini Kolhapure
Pallavi Joshi
Radhika Apte
Rajashree
Rohini Hattangadi
Shraddha Kapoor
Shilpa Shirodkar
Smita Patil
Shobhana Samarth
Sonali Bendre
Sonali Kulkarni
Sai Tamhankar
Supriya Pathak
Usha Chavan
Urmila Matondkar
Vandana Gupte

Directors

 Yash Chopra
 Karan Johar
 Madhur Bhandarkar
 Mahesh Manjrekar
 Ashutosh Gowarikar
 Amol Gupte
 Sachin Pilgaonkar
 Nagraj Manjule
 Satish Rajwade
 Ravi Jadhav
 Rohit Shetty
 Ram Gopal Verma
 Ayan Mukherjee
 Sanjay Leela Bhansali
 Zoya Akhtar

Visual artists
 Maria Marshall

Award winners from Maharashtra
Bharat Ratna
 B. R. Ambedkar
 Vinoba Bhave
 Nanaji Deshmukh
 Pandurang Vaman Kane
 Dhondo Keshav Karve
 Lata Mangeshkar
 Sachin Tendulkar

Padma Vibhushan
B. G. Kher, 1954
 Padma Bhushan
 Homi J. Bhabha, Science & Engineering, 1954
 Padma Shri
 Asha Devi Aryanayakam, Public Affairs, 1954

Business and industry 
 Abasaheb Garware, Garware group
 Azim Premji, Wipro
 Baba Kalyani (Babasaheb Nilaknthrao Kalyani), Bharat Forge
 Baburao Govindrao Shirke, Shirke Group of Companies
 Baburaoji Parkhe, Parkhe group
 Bhavarlal Jain, Jain Irrigation
 Chandrasekhar Bhaskar Bhave, SEBI Chairman
 Chandrashekhar Agashe, BMSS
 Dajikaka Gadgil, PNG Jewellers
 Deepak Ghaisas, Iflex
 Dilip Dandekar, Camlin
 Ganesh Gadgil, PNG Jewellers
 Jyoti Gogte, Golden Nugget Engineering & Electroplast
 Kalpana Saroj, Kamani Tubes 
 Kiran Karnik, former president of NASSCOM, 2007–08
 Panditrao Agashe, BMSS
 Purshottam Narayan Gadgil, PNG Jewellers
 Rahul Bajaj, Bajaj Group
 Rajendra Pawar, NIIT
 Raosaheb Gogte, Gogte Group
 S L Kirloskar (Shantanurao), Kirloskar group
 Subhash Runwal, Runwal Group Chairman 
 Vikram Pandit, Citigroup CEO
 Vivek Ranadive, TIBCO
 Walchand Hirachand, Walchand Group of Industries

Defence forces 
General Arun S. Vaidya
Namdeo Jadav
Yeshwant Ghadge
Manoj Mukund Narwane

Gallantry honors

Param Vir Chakra
Lieutenant Colonel Ardeshir Burzorji Tarapore, Poona Horse (posthumous)
Major Rama Raghoba Rane Bombay Engineers
 Major Ramaswamy Parameshwaran

Journalism 
 Nanasaheb Parulekar, founder editor of Sakal

Literature
Vasant Purushottam Kale
Ranjit Desai
N. S. Inamdar
Shivaji Sawant
Acharya Atre
B. S. Mardhekar
G. A. Kulkarni
G. D. Madgulkar
Gangadhar Gadgil
Kusumagraj
Mangesh Padgaonkar
P. L. Deshpande
Vasant Abaji Dahake
Vasant Kanetkar
Vijay Tendulkar
Vilas Sarang
Vinda Karandikar
Baba Kadam, novelist
Babasaheb Purandare
Vishnu Sakharam Khandekar
Shirish Kanekar
Suhas Shirvalkar
Nagnath Lalujirao Kottapalle
Sadashiv Ranade
Gangadhar Pathak
Dinkar G. Kelkar

Medicine
 B. K. Misra, neurosurgeon

Music

 Mandar Agashe, music director
 Vineet Alurkar, musician
 Aarya Ambekar, singer
 Kishori Amonkar, singer
 Ajay Atul, music director
 Prabha Atre, singer
 Swapnil Bandodkar, singer
 Ashwini Bhide, singer
 Shamika Bhide, singer
 Asha Bhosle, singer
 Vasantrao Deshpande, classical singer of Patiala Gharana
 Bal Gandharva, theatre
 Sawai Gandharva, singer
 Avdhoot Gupte, singer
 Bhimsen Joshi, classical singer
 Suman Kalyanpur, singer
 Kesarbai Kerkar, singer
 Shrinivas Khale, music director
 Shalmali Kholgade, singer
 Mogubai Kurdikar, singer
 Prathamesh Laghate, singer
 Deenanath Mangeshkar, theatre
 Lata Mangeshkar, singer
 Usha Mangeshkar, singer
 Ketaki Mategaonkar, singer
 Zubin Mehta, conductor
 Vaishali Mhade, singer
 Anuradha Paudwal, singer
 Ashutosh Phatak, music director
 Rohit Raut, singer
 Vaishali Samant, singer
 Sadhana Sargam, singer
 Abhijeet Sawant, singer
 Bela Shende, singer
 Adarsh Shinde, singer
 Rahul Vaidya, singer 
 Mugdha Vaishampayan, singer
 Suresh Wadkar, singer

Hop Hop
Divine, rapper
Naezy, rapper

Police 
Vijay Salaskar
Ashok Kamte
Tukaram Omble
Vishwas Nangare Patil
Hemant Karkare

Politics

Rajya Sabha members
 List of Rajya Sabha members from Maharashtra

Chief ministers
 List of Chief Ministers of Maharashtra

Others
Ajit Pawar
Anant Gadgil
Anil Shirole
Babasaheb Ambedkar
Bal Thackeray
Balasaheb Desai
Balasaheb Vikhe Patil
Chhagan Bhujbal
Dhulappa Bhaurao Navale
Ganpatrao Deshmukh
Gopal Ganesh Agarkar
Gopal Krishna Gokhale
Gopinath Munde
Hari Shivaram Rajguru
Haribhau Jawale
Keshavrao Jedhe
Manikrao Thakre
Manohar Joshi
Narayan Rane
Patangrao Kadam
Prakash Ambedkar
Pramod Mahajan
Prithviraj Chavan
R R Patil
Raj Thackeray
Ram Shinde
Ramdas Athawale
Rani Lakshmibai
Senapati Bapat
Shankarrao Chavan
Sharad Pawar
Shivraj Patil
Shrikant Jichkar
Shripad Amrit Dange
Siddharth Shirole
Sudhakarrao Naik
Sunil Deshmukh
Sushilkumar Shinde
Tatya Tope
Uddhav Thackeray
Vasantrao Naik
Vasantdada Patil
Vilasrao Deshmukh
Vinayak Damodar Savarkar
Yashwantrao Chavan

Religion
 Babasaheb Ambedkar
 Samarth Ramdas, Sajjangad
 Saint Tukaram, Dehu
 Saint Namdev, Pandharpur
 Saint Dnyaneshwar, Alandi
 Saint Eknath, Paithan
 Sai Baba
 Gajanan Maharaj, Shegaon
 Chokha Mela, Mangalvedhe
 Gora Kumbhar, Terdhoki
 Muktabai (Kothali), Muktainagar
 Bahinabai
 Janabai, Pandharpur
 Kanhopatra, Pandharpur
 Shri BrahmaChaitanya, Gondavale
 Swami Samartha Maharaj, Akkalkot
 Jangali Maharaj, Pune
 Zakir Naik, Mumbai
 Rufus Pereira, Mumbai, Roman Catholic priest and exorcist

Rulers
Krishna
Ramachandra
Chhatrapati Shivaji Maharaj
Chhatrapati Sambhaji Maharaj
Madhavrao I
Ahilyabai Holkar
Shahu II of Kolhapur
Mahadaji Shinde
Malhar Rao Holkar
Yashwantrao Holkar
Baji Rao I
Khemirao Sarnaik

Scientists
Vijay Bhatkar
Anil Kakodkar
Madhav Gadgil
Raghunath Anant Mashelkar
Jayant Narlikar
Shekhar C. Mande
Chandreshekhar Sonwane
Chandrashekhar Khare
Narendra Karmarkar
Shreeram Shankar Abhyankar
Shrinivas Kulkarni
Abhay Ashtekar
Aravind Joshi
Subhash Khot
Ashok Gadgil
Anandi Gopal Joshi
Tatyarao Lahane

Social activists
 Baba Amte
 Pandurang Shastri Athavale
 Sindhutai Sapkal
 Babasaheb Ambedkar
 Mahatma Jyotiba Phule 
 Ashok Row Kavi
 Dhondo Keshav Karve
 Banoo Jehangir Coyaji
 Kisan Mehta
 Harish Iyer
 Manibhai Desai
 Anna Hazare
 Medha Patkar
 Savitribai Phule
 Abhay Bang
 Vinoba Bhave
 Bhaurao Patil
 Lokmanya Tilak
 Veer Savarkar
 Anna Bhau Sathe
 Prakash Amte
 Hari Narke
 Shivrampant Damle

Sports

Badminton
 Nandu M. Natekar
 Aparna Popat

Chess
 Praveen Thipsay
 Abdul Jabbar

Contract bridge
 Jaggy Shivdasani
 Orlando Campos
 Ramesh Gokhale
 Keshav Samant, popularly known as Anand Samant

Cricket

 Abhishek Nayar
 Ajinkya Rahane
 Ajit Agarkar
 Ashutosh Agashe
 Baloo Gupte
 Chandrakant Pandit
 Chandrakant Patankar
 Chandrasekhar Gadkari
 Chandu Borde
 Dattaram Hindlekar
 Dattu Phadkar
 Dilip Vengsarkar
 Dnyaneshwar Agashe
 Hemant Kanitkar
 Hemu Adhikari
 Hrishikesh Kanitkar
 Kedar Jadhav
 Khandu Rangnekar
 Kiran More
 Manohar Hardikar
 Nilesh Kulkarni
 Paras Mhambrey
 Phiroze Palia
 Polly Umrigar
 Pravin Amre
 Rahul Dravid
 Ramnath Parkar
 Ravi Shastri
 Rohan Gavaskar
 Rohit Sharma
 Sachin Tendulkar
 Sairaj Bahutule
 Salil Ankola
 Sameer Dighe
 Sandip Patil
 Sanjay Bangar
 Sanjay Manjrekar
 Shardul Thakur
 Shreyas Iyer
 Subhash Gupte
 Sunil Gavaskar
 Umesh Yadav
 Vijay Hazare
 Vijay Manjrekar
 Vijay Merchant
 Vinod Kambli
 Vinoo Mankad
 Wasim Jaffer
 Zaheer Khan

Hockey
 Dhanraj Pillay
 Viren Rasquinha
 Hiranna M. Nimal

Shooting
 Anjali Ved Pathak Bhagwat
 Tejaswini Sawant

Other sports
 Ashish Mane - Mountaineerng
 Gaurav Natekar - Tennis
 Khashaba Jadhav - Wrestling, won first Olympic individual medal for India
 Murlikant Petkar - Swimming, India's first Paralympic Gold Medalist

Criminals and gangsters
Arun Gawli
Dawood Ibrahim, criminal and drug dealer
Chhota Rajan
Manya Surve
Maya Dolas
Tiger Memon
Yakub Memon

See also
 List of Marathi people
 List of people by India state
 List of people from Nagpur

References

Maharashtra|*